Coyote Acres is a census-designated place (CDP) in Jim Wells County, Texas, United States. The population was 508 at the 2010 census, up from 389 at the 2000 census.

Geography
It is bordered to the east by Alice Acres.

Demographics
As of the census of 2000, there were 389 people, 109 households, and 92 families residing in the CDP. The population density was 76.2 people per square mile (29.4/km2). There were 113 housing units at an average density of 22.1/sq mi (8.5/km2). The racial makeup of the CDP was 65.55% White, 0.77% African American, 32.90% from other races, and 0.77% from two or more races. Hispanic or Latino of any race were 86.63% of the population.

There were 109 households, out of which 45.9% had children under the age of 18 living with them, 60.6% were married couples living together, 20.2% had a female householder with no husband present, and 14.7% were non-families. 11.0% of all households were made up of individuals, and 1.8% had someone living alone who was 65 years of age or older. The average household size was 3.57 and the average family size was 3.83.

In the CDP, the population was spread out, with 37.5% under the age of 18, 11.1% from 18 to 24, 25.2% from 25 to 44, 20.6% from 45 to 64, and 5.7% who were 65 years of age or older. The median age was 26 years. For every 100 females, there were 105.8 males. For every 100 females age 18 and over, there were 102.5 males.

The median income for a household in the CDP was $19,250, and the median income for a family was $14,083. Males had a median income of $26,518 versus $12,083 for females. The per capita income for the CDP was $6,709. About 45.8% of families and 57.3% of the population were below the poverty line, including 69.4% of those under age 18 and none of those age 65 or over.

Education
Coyote Acres is served by the Alice Independent School District. The district operates Alice High School.

References

Census-designated places in Jim Wells County, Texas
Census-designated places in Texas